Syberia-Wapniska  is a settlement in the administrative district of Gmina Lubowidz, within Żuromin County, Masovian Voivodeship, in east-central Poland.

References

Syberia-Wapniska